Mher Mesropyan, better known as his stage name Mger Armenia (also Mher Armenia) is an Armenian singer. 

In 2017, Mesropyan was awarded with the title of Honored Artist of Armenia upon the decree of Armenian president Serzh Sargsyan. He attempted to represent Armenia in the Eurovision Song Contest in 2009 and 2018, but did not succeed on either occasion, finishing 2nd and 9th respectively. He has a sister, Roza Filberg, who is an actress and a singer. In many occasions, Mesropyan has advocated for the recognition of the Artsakh Republic and has a song dedicated to the unrecognized country.

Awards and nominations

References

1981 births
Living people
Musicians from Yerevan
21st-century Armenian male singers
Armenian pop singers
Armenian folk-pop singers
Honored artists of Armenia